Extremely Severe Cyclonic Storm Hudhud was a strong tropical cyclone that caused extensive damage and loss of life in eastern India and Nepal during October 2014. Hudhud originated from a low-pressure system that formed under the influence of an upper-air cyclonic circulation in the Andaman Sea on October 6. Hudhud intensified into a cyclonic storm on October 8 and as a Severe Cyclonic Storm on October 9. Hudhud underwent rapid deepening in the following days and was classified as a Very Severe Cyclonic Storm by the IMD. The system then drifted northwards towards Uttar Pradesh and Nepal, causing widespread rains in both areas and heavy snowfall in the latter.
 
Hudhud caused extensive damage to the city of Visakhapatnam and the neighbouring districts of Vizianagaram and Srikakulam of Andhra Pradesh. Damages were estimated to be 219 billion (US$3.58 billion) by the Andhra state government. At least 124 deaths have been confirmed, a majority of them from Andhra Pradesh and Nepal, with the latter experiencing an avalanche due to the cyclone.

Meteorological history

Under the influence of an upper-air cyclonic circulation, a low-pressure area formed over the Andaman Sea on October 6. It slowly consolidated and was upgraded to a depression by the India Meteorological Department (IMD) on October 7. While over open waters, the depression continued to encounter a favorable environment, and a Tropical Cyclone Formation Alert (TCFA) was issued by the Joint Typhoon Warning Center (JTWC), followed by IMD upgrading the storm into a deep depression.

In the early hours of October 8, the JTWC started issuing its advisories for the system as it recorded tropical storm winds at the storm's centre. The IMD later reported that the deep depression made its first landfall over Long Island, Andaman, and had reached cyclonic storm intensity, naming it Hudhud. After entering the Bay of Bengal, Hudhud continued to intensify the following day, and was upgraded to a severe cyclonic storm.

Early on October 10, the JTWC classified the storm as a Category 1 tropical cyclone after it formed a microwave eye feature and was located in an environment favorable for further intensification with moderate wind shear. The IMD upgraded Hudhud to a very severe cyclonic storm later the same day, and the JTWC further upgraded the storm to a Category 2 tropical cyclone.

On October 11, Hudhud underwent rapid intensification and developed an eye at its center. Maintaining intensity, it made landfall over Visakhapatnam, Andhra Pradesh at noon of October 12, near . The strength of the winds disrupted telecommunication lines and damaged the radar, inhibiting further observations.

Bringing extensive damage to the coastal districts of Andhra Pradesh, Hudhud gradually weakened as it curved northwards over land. The storm continued its weakening trend and was last noted as a well-marked low-pressure area over east Uttar Pradesh on October 14.  Unlike most BoB storms that dissipate quickly over land, Hudhud has been the only TC whose remnant ever reached as far north as the Himalayas.

Preparations and impact

India

In light of the storm, the National Disaster Response Force (NDRF) mobilized 35 teams in Andhra Pradesh and Odisha. The East Coast Railway cancelled 38 trains on October 12 when the cyclone made landfall.

Andhra Pradesh
An alert was sounded in nine out of thirteen districts of Andhra Pradesh where standing crops including paddy, groundnut, sugarcane, and pulses were yet to be harvested. Over 700,000 people, including 500,000 people in Andhra Pradesh, were evacuated and put up in relief camps & emergency bunkers. The local government made arrangements to shift half a million people in all.

Hudhud crossed the coast of Andhra Pradesh at the noon of October 12 over Visakhapatnam, with winds exceeding . As per initial reports, 3 people were killed due to heavy rainfall accompanied by strong winds in coastal areas. Within hours of hitting the coast, the cyclone severed the radar link of Visakhapatnam Cyclone Warning Centre.

Hundreds of vehicles parked on roads were damaged while heavy rains inundated a few colonies. The runway at Visakhapatnam Airport was flooded and the radar and navigational aids were destroyed. The roof of the terminal was torn apart due to the speed of the cyclone. Villages near Vizag were also significantly affected by Hudhud, including Kasimkota, which is known for its robust food distribution system during the cyclone that became standard ration procedure for Visakhapatnam disaster management.

Hudhud caused 61 deaths within Andhra Pradesh and an estimated damage of 219 billion (US$3.58 billion), including the industrial damage of 61.36 billion (US$1 billion).

TDP supremo N. Chandrababu Naidu was lauded for his efforts in disaster management during the cyclone. He mobilised the Army, Navy, and the National Disaster Response Force to provide relief to over 2,80,000 people in 44 mandals across four districts. He shifted base from Hyderabad to Visakhapatnam after the cyclone made landfall. To monitor the disaster relief work that was being undertaken, he stayed in a bus parked outside the city collectorate. He also undertook visits to districts bordering Odisha such as Srikakulam which were badly hit by the cyclone. Post the disaster, he vowed to rebuild Vizag which was badly affected by it.

Odisha
The Odisha government had placed 16 districts under high alert: Balasore, Kendrapara, Bhadrak, Jagatsinghpur, Puri, Ganjam, Mayurbhanj, Jajpur, Cuttack, Khurdha, Nayagarh, Gajapati, Dhenkanal, Keonjhar, Malkangiri and Koraput.

At the time of the storm landfall, strong winds and heavy rainfall commenced in southern Odisha districts, leading to disruption in power supply. Wind speeds reaching  were predicted in the region. 2 people were killed in Odisha.Government of Odisha Also dispatched thirty teams from OSDMA for help in relief and rescue to Andhra Pradesh.

Elsewhere
On October 8, while Hudhud was gaining cyclonic storm intensity, the authorities closed schools and cancelled ferry services in and around the Andaman Islands.Local fishermen were warned about the storm. The Andaman Trunk Road, one of the major roads traversing the island, was shut down after trees were uprooted due to the storm's force. Landslides were reported on the island, causing some power and communication lines to fail. Hudhud killed 18 people in the Uttar Pradesh.

Nepal

On 14 October 2014, sudden weather changes caused by Hudhud in Nepal reportedly caused avalanches arround Dhaulagiri and Annapurna. The avalanches and heavy snowfall killed at least 43 hikers and guides in Nepal.

Aftermath

The Prime Minister of India, Narendra Modi announced on October 15 that 1000 crore (US$163 million) was to be awarded as aid for affected areas in Andhra Pradesh. Also, the  JK Tyre FMSCI National Karting Championship  held by the FMSCI in Vishakapatnam for its final round of the championship had to be postponed.

See also

1977 Andhra Pradesh cyclone
1999 Odisha cyclone
Cyclone Phailin
Cyclone Fani
Tropical cyclones in India

Notes

References

External links

 List of Cancelled and Diverted Trains

2014 North Indian Ocean cyclone season
Tropical cyclones in India
History of Andhra Pradesh (1947–2014)
Disasters in Andhra Pradesh
2010s in Odisha
Disasters in Odisha
Extremely severe cyclonic storms
October 2014 events in Asia
Tropical cyclones in 2014
Tropical cyclones in Nepal
2014 in Nepal